Groovespot (more properly groove spot) is a disco funk band based in Richmond, Virginia. Founded in 1997 by Greg Hill and Thomas Young, the band became one of central Virginia's most popular acts selling out shows in nightclubs and festivals.

Origins
The original band comprised Sean Shields, Chris Perkins, Steve Bider, David Allam along with Greg Hill and Young.  By 1998, the group was headlining local festivals such as Friday Cheers, Innsbrook, and First Fridays in Roanoke. Additionally, they were support artists for national acts such as Average White Band, Jefferson Starship, Tower of Power, Parliament, 10000 Maniacs, KC and the Sunshine Band, and Eddie Money.

Band additions
In 1999, the band added new members Chris Leitch, formerly of Mercury Records Recording Artists Fighting Gravity, Stefan Demetriadis, formerly of Mojo Records artists The Ernies, Scott Frock (Trumpet for Daelfalio Marsalies, Sturgill Simpson, Nathaniel Ratliff) and new singer and local music legend, Barbara Wills. 2000, saw the addition of Dave Triplet and Chuck Harrell. As of 2006, David Sullivan and Sara Leitch handle the vocal duties with new drummer, Keith Cable. Saxophonist Steve Kraus joined the Band in 2008. After a spell without shows, Thomas Young continued with the band. As performer and manager. Several fundraisers were done and performances for Non profits to include REAL LIFE. GrooveSpot is currently working on a new single to be released in the summer of 2021.

Backup to William Hung
In 2004, they acted as the backing band for American Idol reject, William Hung, as he performed his version of "She Bangs".

References

External links
Official website

Musical groups established in 1997